Jason Dean may refer to:

Jason Dean (Charmed), a character from the television series Charmed
 character played by Christian Slater in the film Heathers
 alter ego of rapper Godemis of the rap duo Ces Cru